Cubatão River may refer to several rivers in Brazil:

 Cubatão River (Paraná)
 Cubatão River (São Paulo)
 Cubatão River (north Santa Catarina)
 Cubatão River (south Santa Catarina)